Alexandrovka is a rural locality (a village) in Bedeyevo-Polyansky Selsoviet, Blagoveshchensky District, Bashkortostan, Russia. The population was 171 as of 2010.

Geography 
It is located 52 km from Blagoveshchensk and 5 km from Bedeyeva Polyana.

References 

Rural localities in Blagoveshchensky District